Bey's Palace or Ahmad Bey Palace is a historic palace in Constantine, Algeria. The palace was one of the main sights during the selection of Constantine as Arab Capital of Culture in 2015.

History
The palace was commissioned during the rule of Ahmed Bey ben Mohamed Chérif. Groundbreaking was in 1825, and completion was in 1835, two years before the fall of Constantine into the French occupation. Ahmad Bay summoned a Genovese engineer Chiavino, and two well known artists Al-Jabari and Al-Khatabi for the architectural design.

When the inauguration commenced in 1835–36, Ahmed Bey inhabited the palace as he became the ruler. Ahmed's enjoyment of this wonderful place was short-lived. Two years after he moved in, the French chased him out and turned the palace into their headquarters and with independence the Algerian military moved in and set up camp.

Building description
The palace consists of three suites and a garden where orange trees and palm trees are planted. The suites are connected to the hallway, which has arcs supported by 266 columns made of marbles. There are also three courtyards and two fountains made of marble. The ceilings are tiled with marble as well. There are 540 doors made of cedar woods, inscribed and engraved with different sculptures and decorations. More than 2,000 square meters of palace walls were decorated with paintings depicting Ahmed Bey's travels to Alexandria, Tripoli and Algeria, as well as 15 months of travel to Istanbul, Cairo and Hejaz in 1818 and 1819 in addition to other travels before and after his reign as Bey of Constantine.

Gallery

See also
 Palace of the Dey in Algiers
 Bey's Palace in Oran

References

1835 establishments in Africa
Buildings and structures completed in 1835
Palaces in Algeria
Landmarks in Algeria
Buildings and structures in Constantine Province
Ottoman architecture in Algeria